The Veal School near Roopville, Georgia was built in 1900 and expanded in 1929.  It served as a school until 1949.  Since then it became used by its community.  It was listed on the National Register of Historic Places in 2005.

It is a one-story building with cedar shingles and four classrooms.  The 1929 expansion added hallways between the classrooms and an auditorium.

The auditorium was used for roller skating on Friday nights beginning in 1954.  It has also been used for movies, meetings, concerts, theatre, sports and fundraisers.  It was deeded by the Carroll County Board of Education to the community in 1955.

References

School buildings on the National Register of Historic Places in Georgia (U.S. state)
Buildings and structures in Carroll County, Georgia
National Register of Historic Places in Carroll County, Georgia

School buildings completed in 1900
1900 establishments in Georgia (U.S. state)